Strophurus taeniatus, also known commonly as the phasmid striped gecko or  the white-striped gecko, is a species of lizard in the family Diplodactylidae. The species is endemic to Australia.

Geographic range
S. taeniatus is found in the northern parts of the Australian states and territories of Northern Territory, Queensland, and Western Australia.

Habitat
The preferred habitats of S. taeniatus are grassland and rocky areas.

Reproduction
S. taeniatus is oviparous.

References

Further reading
Cogger HG (2014). Reptiles and Amphibians of Australia, Seventh Edition. Clayton, Victoria, Australia: CSIRO Publishing. xxx + 1,033 pp. .
Laver RJ, Nielsen SV, Rosauer DF, Oliver PM (2017). "Trans-biome diversity in Australian grass-specialist lizards (Diplodactylidae: Strophurus)". Molecular Phylogenetics and Evolution 115: 62–70.
Lönnberg E, Andersson LG (1913). "Results of Dr. E. Mjöbergs Swedish Scientific Expeditions to Australia 1910—13. III. Reptiles". Kongliga Svenska Vetenskapsakademiens Handlingar, Ny Följd, Stockholm 52 (3): 1–17. (Oedurella taeniata, new species, pp. 5–6, Figures 1–3).
Wilson, Steve; Swan, Gerry (2013). A Complete Guide to Reptiles of Australia, Fourth Edition. Sydney, New South Wales, Australia: New Holland Publishers. 522 pp. .

Strophurus
Geckos of Australia
Reptiles described in 1913
Taxa named by Einar Lönnberg
Taxa named by Lars Gabriel Andersson